Idneodes is a genus of snout moths. It was described by Émile Louis Ragonot in 1892, and contains the species Idneodes tretopteralis. It is found in Brazil.

References

Chrysauginae
Monotypic moth genera
Moths of South America
Pyralidae genera
Taxa named by Émile Louis Ragonot